Paul Koretz (born April 3, 1955) is an American politician, who served as a member of the Los Angeles City Council for the 5th district from 2009 to 2022. He was previously a member of the California State Assembly and the West Hollywood City Council.

Early life and career 
Koretz earned a bachelor's degree in history from UCLA in 1979, where he was a founder of the "Bruin Democrats". While he was a student at UCLA during the 1970s, he was defeated for a seat on the Los Angeles Unified School District Board of Education. Koretz then served as an aide to then-Los Angeles City Councilmember Zev Yaroslavsky in 1975, and then served as an aide to Los Angeles City Councilmember Marvin Braude in 1984.  After his marriage to Gail, the Koretz family moved less than a mile away from his parents' home to an area where his father originally lived upon moving to Los Angeles.

City of West Hollywood
In 1984, Koretz supported the creation of the City of West Hollywood from what was then unincorporated Los Angeles County. Koretz campaigned for the City's incorporation while managing the City Council campaign of Alan Viterbi and served as Viterbi's deputy after his election. Upon Viterbi's retirement in 1988, Koretz was elected to the West Hollywood City Council.

As Councilman, Koretz appointed Kevin Norte to the City's Rent Stabilization Commission in 1992, that commission's first openly gay chair for two one-year terms. Koretz also appointed former Log Cabin Republicans member and Equality California leader attorney John Duran to replace Norte as Koretz's appointee to the Rent Stabilization Commission. Duran would go on to succeed Koretz on the West Hollywood City Council.

In 1988, Koretz sponsored a citywide ban on semi-automatic rifles, which built momentum for a subsequent statewide "assault weapons" ban. In 1996, Koretz co-sponsored the City's ban on "Saturday Night Specials." The city was the first to enact such a ban, which survived various legal assaults by the National Rifle Association. Koretz also sponsored an ordinance limiting handgun purchases to one gun per month in order to cut the resale of guns on the black market. Koretz served as Mayor and City Councilman for twelve years before being elected to the State Assembly.

Koretz's former colleague on the West Hollywood City Council, Abbe Land, was a candidate for Koretz's seat in the California State Assembly, and faced former Los Angeles City Council member Mike Feuer in the June 6, 2006 Democratic primary. Koretz endorsed Feuer, who defeated Land, winning 52.4% of the vote to her 36.3%.

California State Assembly (2000–2006) 
Koretz represented the 42nd district in the California State Assembly from 2000 to 2006, serving the maximum three terms allowed under California term limit law. The district included West Hollywood, Beverly Hills, Universal City, and the portions of the City of Los Angeles encompassing the Sunset Strip, Hollywood, Hancock Park, Los Feliz, Westwood, Brentwood, Studio City, Encino, Sherman Oaks, and North Hollywood/Valley Village.

During his six years in the Assembly, Koretz served as the Chair of the Assembly Labor Committee since his first year in the Assembly. He also chaired the Assembly Select Committee on Gun Violence and the Assembly Select Committee on California's nursing shortage. Koretz was also a member of the Health, Public Safety, Business & Professions, Insurance and Natural Resources committees.

Koretz was the first Southern California Director of the California League of Conservation Voters and served as administrative director of the Ecology Center of Southern California. In the Assembly, he introduced legislation requiring retailers profiting from the most commonly littered items to share some of the costs of removing trash from storm water runoff, and he is the joint-author of legislation to ban the use of dry cleaner solutions found to be carcinogenic.

Post-legislative service 
In November 2006, Koretz ran for the West Basin Water District, but narrowly lost the seat by a little more than 1% of the vote.

In June 2007, Koretz was nominated by Assembly Speaker Fabian Nunez to the California Board of Podriatic Medicine.

Los Angeles City Council (2009–2022)

Elections 
In 2009, Koretz began his first term as a City Councilmember representing the 5th District of Los Angeles. He has been re-elected twice to the role, in 2013 and 2017. In 2017, Koretz secured 65.88% of the vote in the city's primary election.

Tenure 
In 2018, Koretz lobbied successfully against California Senate Bill 827, with a goal of preventing new development. He stated that the bill would "have a neighborhood with little 1920s, '30s and '40s single-family homes look like Dubai 10 years later".

In 2020, Paul Koretz voted against a bill to reduce the LAPD budget in the wake of protests against police violence, which passed by an 11–3 vote.

In the wake of racist comments by Council President Nury Martinez and other councilmembers, Paul Koretz joined other councilmembers demanding the resignations of Martinez, Kevin De Leon, and Gil Cedillo.

Opposition to bike-friendly infrastructure 
In the mid-2010s, Koretz repeatedly blocked efforts to build a bikeway network in Westwood, Los Angeles. Koretz claimed that the bike lanes would be dangerous and would increase traffic by taking the place of parking spaces and turning lanes.

Koretz blocked the provision of $50 million state dollars for the "Uplift Melrose" project, a plan to revitalize Melrose Avenue, create raised crossroads, bus lanes and covered bus stops, increase tree canopy cover and separated bike lanes. He said in a letter that the plan would impact emergency responders, but was accused of NIMBYism by critics.

Obstruction of public records request and LAPD Spying Lawsuit 

In April 2022, the Stop LAPD Spying Coalition filed a lawsuit over Paul Koretz’s failure to respond to a public records request regarding his communications with the Simon Wiesenthal Center as Koretz helped the Simon Wiesenthal Center secure a grant from the Trump administration to develop a surveillance program in Los Angeles high schools. According to the LAPD Spying Coalition, the records were not sent for 14 months until the day of the lawsuit's filing.

LA Animal Services controversy 
In September 2022, A director of volunteer programs at Los Angeles Animal Services, Juan Rivera, claimed she was fired for refusing to hand over her phone prior to a meeting. Several other volunteers were reportedly fired after whistleblowing on the shelter's staff shortages and inhumane conditions. The Los Angeles Times also found that dogs were often confined for weeks at a time. Kenneth Mejia, Koretz's opponent in the 2022 Los Angeles City Controller election, aired an advertisement that criticized Koretz's handling of LA Animal Services. Volunteers in Mejia's video claimed that Koretz, as the chair of the Animal Services committee, had known about the poor conditions for years.

In response, Paul Koretz released a 48 page report detailing whistleblower concerns and recommendations on how to improve shelter conditions. Koretz also proposed reinstating workers, increasing funding, expanding play programs, and improving volunteer relations but also stated he has “no ability to order the department to do anything.”

Farewell speech controversy 
Following the 2022 Los Angeles City Council controversy and ongoing disruptions and protests of council meetings, Koretz ended his final speech as a member of the City Council with explicit language directed at activists by appropriating a quote from activist Jeremy Frisch. He received applause by staffers and a standing ovation by some fellow councilmembers, though he was criticized for his language by commentators and constituents on social media.

2022 Los Angeles City Controller election 
Paul Koretz announced his candidacy for LA city controller on 2020 Jan 8. Koretz faced criticism when a Commissioner of the LA Department of Water and Power held a fundraiser for Koretz's campaign for city controller. Under Los Angeles's campaign laws, it is illegal for city commissioners to fundraise or promote for a candidate. Koretz appeared to again violate campaign ethics laws when his campaign sent an email to the Reseda Neighborhood Council mailing list.

Paul Koretz advanced to the general election after placing 2nd place in the primary election with 23.67% of the vote. He was defeated in the general election by Certified Public Accountant and activist Kenneth Mejia, 60.8% to 39.2%. Paul Koretz conceded on Nov 9, stating in an interview to the LA Times, “I’m clearly not going to win at this point”.

2022 Los Angeles City Controller election results

Personal life 
Koretz's wife, Gail, served as local government liaison for the office of Los Angeles mayor Eric Garcetti. They have one child, Rachel. The Koretz family resides in the Beverly-Fairfax District of Los Angeles.

References

External links
 5th District Website
 - Join California Paul Koretz

1955 births
American people of German-Jewish descent
Living people
Los Angeles City Council members
Democratic Party members of the California State Assembly
University of California, Los Angeles alumni
21st-century American politicians